Darth Plagueis is a fictional character in the Star Wars franchise. A Sith Lord with the ability to prevent death and create life, Plagueis is the mentor of Sheev Palpatine/Darth Sidious, who, in accordance to the Sith's Rule of Two, eventually betrays Plagueis by murdering him in his sleep, taking his place as Sith Master. The character is first mentioned on-screen in the 2005 film Star Wars: Episode III – Revenge of the Sith, in which Palpatine frames his life and death as a "legend" to pique Anakin Skywalker's curiosity about the dark side of the Force. Plagueis has a more prominent presence in the Star Wars Expanded Universe.

Development
The character of Darth Plagueis was conceived by George Lucas as early as the first draft of the screenplay for Star Wars: Episode III – Revenge of the Sith, or possibly earlier. The first draft dates from April 2003.

Appearances

Revenge of the Sith
Darth Plagueis is first mentioned in the 2005 prequel film Revenge of the Sith. While attending the opera, Palpatine, who is secretly the Sith Lord Darth Sidious, tells Anakin Skywalker about the tragedy of Darth Plagueis "The Wise". Palpatine explains that Plagueis had mastered the dark side of the Force to such an extent that he could prevent death and create life; powers which are unknown to the Jedi. Despite this, however, Plagueis was unable to prevent his own death at the hands of his apprentice (who was none other than Palpatine himself), and was murdered in his sleep. Later in the film, Palpatine, as Sidious, tempts Anakin to the dark side by promising to use its power to prevent Anakin's pregnant wife Padmé Amidala from dying, as Anakin had foreseen.

The Rise of Skywalker novelization
Darth Plagueis is mentioned in Rae Carson's novelization of the 2019 film The Rise of Skywalker. In the book, it is revealed that Palpatine had discovered Plagueis' "secret to immortality", using this knowledge to resurrect himself after his death in Return of the Jedi. The novel further explains that Plagueis had attempted to create a powerful connection with Palpatine known as a 'Force dyad', a concept mentioned in the film as occurring naturally between Rey and Ben Solo. Plagueis' inability to use his powers to save himself from death is also detailed in the novelization; Plagueis "had not acted fast enough in his own moment of death" to prevent Palpatine from killing him.

Legends
In April 2014, Lucasfilm rebranded most of the licensed Star Wars novels and comics produced since the originating 1977 film Star Wars as Star Wars Legends and declared them non-canon to the franchise. Star Wars Legends literature elaborates on Plagueis' life, apprenticeship under the Bith Sith Lord Darth Tenebrous, and mentorship of Palpatine, up until his death at the latter's hands.

Star Wars: Darth Plagueis 

The character is the focus of Star Wars: Darth Plagueis, a Legends novel written by James Luceno and published on January 10, 2012. The novel covers the later life and machinations of Darth Plagueis (born Hego Damassk II), over a roughly fifty-year period pre-dating and culminating concurrently with the climax of The Phantom Menace. The novel details Plagueis' overthrow of his own master Darth Tenebrous; his work as head of a powerful banking consortium on the Muun homeworld; his discovery, recruitment and training of the teenaged Palpatine of Naboo; and the efforts of Plagueis to undermine the Galactic Republic and ensure the dominance of the dark side of the Force. Even though Plagueis' plans to undermine the Galactic Republic were stopped by his death, Palpatine still succeeded in wiping out the Galactic Republic and driving the Jedi Order into ruins for his own plans.

Daryl Thomen of Newsday called Darth Plagueis "the best Star Wars publication to date."

Reception
Despite never appearing on screen, Darth Plagueis has remained a popular Star Wars character. The scene in which the character is mentioned in Revenge of the Sith has become an internet meme.

References

External links 
 

Characters created by George Lucas
Extraterrestrial supervillains
Film characters introduced in 2005
Fictional bankers
Fictional businesspeople
Fictional characters with disfigurements
Fictional characters with electric or magnetic abilities
Fictional humanoids
Fictional lords and ladies
Fictional murderers
Fictional murdered people
Fictional scientists
Internet memes introduced in the 2010s
Male characters in literature
Male literary villains
Star Wars Sith characters
Unseen characters
Star Wars literary characters
Internet memes introduced in 2017